Mykola Volosyanko (13 March 1972 – 6 June 2012) was a Ukrainian professional footballer and assistant manager.

Volosyanko was born in Ivano-Frankivsk Oblast.  He made his professional debut in the Soviet Second League in 1989 for FC Prykarpattya Ivano-Frankivsk.

Volosyanko died on 6 June 2012 from apparent heart failure.

Honours
 Ukrainian Premier League champion: 1997, 1998.
 Ukrainian Cup winner: 1998.

References

1972 births
2012 deaths
Soviet footballers
Ukrainian footballers
Ukrainian expatriate footballers
Ukraine international footballers
Ukrainian Premier League players
FC Dynamo Kyiv players
FC Mariupol players
FC Arsenal Kyiv players
FC Volyn Lutsk players
FC Spartak Ivano-Frankivsk players
FC CSKA Kyiv players
FC Chernomorets Novorossiysk players
FC Borysfen Boryspil players
Expatriate footballers in Russia
Association football defenders
Sportspeople from Ivano-Frankivsk Oblast